Surjit Kaur Barnala is a Sikh politician from Punjab, India. She is the president of Shiromani Akali Dal (Longowal), a party which aims to support the thinking of Harcharan Singh Longowal and to get the  Rajiv-Longowal Accord fully implemented. She was the wife of Surjit Singh Barnala.

Family 

Surjit Singh and Surjit Kaur had a daughter Amrit Kaur Sandhu, who was married to an Army officer Major Adesh Pal Singh Sandhu, but Amrit Kaur died  in October 2012 due to cancer. Their eldest son Jasjit singh Barnala is a businessman, who runs Barnas International Pvt Ltd. The second son, Ganganjit Singh Barnala is also a politician like his father. Their youngest son Neilinder Singh Barnala died in a car accident in 1996. They have seven grandchildren. Her husband died on 14 January 2017 after prolonged illness.

References 

Living people
Shiromani Akali Dal politicians
Indian Sikhs
Women in Punjab, India politics
21st-century Indian women politicians
21st-century Indian politicians
Year of birth missing (living people)